Carol A. Brey-Casiano is an information resource officer, a librarian administrator and former president of the American Library Association.

Education 
Brey-Casiano earned a master's degree in library science from University of Illinois. Brey-Casiano earned a PhD from University of Texas at Austin's Graduate School of Library & Information Science.

Career 
From 1991 to 1995, she was the Director of the Oak Park Public Library.

Brey-Casiano served as executive director of the El Paso Public Library.
In 2001, Brey-Casiano stood up against the Texas Ranger, mayor of El Paso, Texas, a lawyer named Francisco Domínguez, and the El Paso police for the purpose of protecting intellectual freedom and privacy of library users.

From 2004 to 2005, Brey-Casiano served as the president of the American Library Association.

Brey-Casiano also served as an information resource officer for the United States Department of States. 
In September 2017, as the Regional Public Engagement Specialist, Brey-Casiano was an opening ceremony  speaker at the Argentine Binational Center Executive Directors Meeting in Argentina.

Awards 
 2012 Jean E. Coleman Library Outreach Lecture

See also 
 List of presidents of the American Library Association
 Intellectual freedom#LeRoy C. Merritt Humanitarian Fund

References

External links

 Brey-Casiano Delivers 2012 Coleman Lecture at ala.org

 
 

Year of birth missing (living people)
Living people
American librarians
American women librarians
Presidents of the American Library Association
21st-century American women